The 2015–16 season of the Libyan Premier League is the forty-fourth edition of the country's top level association football league since its inception in 1963. It came two and a half years after the last competition was held by the Libyan Football Federation (LFF) due to the security concerns and general unrest throughout the country during the Libyan Crisis and Libyan civil war (2014–present).

Several meeting between the LFF and club representatives were held in the beginning of 2016 to arrange for the re-launch of the competition and it was agreed that the league would commence on 15 May with 21 participating teams. In contrast to the previous seasons, the league is divided into two groups; one for clubs from the eastern region of Libya and one for the clubs from the western region with a Playoffs system held to determine the champion.

Teams 
Due to the situation in Libya in mid-2016 and the difficulty in air-travel, the participating teams were grouped by their geographical location. Teams from each group were scheduled to play every team from their group in a one-legged match with 3 points given for a win and 1 point for a draw. The two teams from group A and the three teams from group B with the highest ranking within their group would then face off in a Single-elimination tournament to determine the champions.

Stadiums 
Neutral stadiums were identified within each region to host group games.

Group stage

Group A

Group B

Championship round 
After 9 rounds in Group A, the two highest ranking teams move on to the Championship Round. Similarly, after 11 rounds in Group B, the three highest ranking teams move on to the Championship Round. The first matches in the Championship Round was played in 28 October.

References 

Libyan Premier League seasons